"Stuck in a Box" is a single by rapper Young Sid from his second studio album, What Doesn't Kill Me..., released on 14 June 2010. It features soul singer Stan Walker.

Chart performance
"Stuck in a Box" débuted on the New Zealand Singles Chart at number twenty-eight. It spent seven weeks in the chart, after peaking at number fifteen.

Track listing

References

Hip hop songs
2010 singles
Stan Walker songs
Song recordings produced by Emile Haynie
Songs written by Emile Haynie
2010 songs